Martin Pavlu (born 8 July 1962) is a Czechoslovak-born Italian former professional ice hockey player and a current assistant coach of the Italian women's national ice hockey team. He represented  in the men's tournaments at the 1984 Winter Olympics, the 1994 Winter Olympics, and the 1998 Winter Olympics, and at twelve Ice Hockey World Championships, including seven Top Division (Group A) tournaments.

References

External links
 

1962 births
Living people
Italian ice hockey left wingers
Olympic ice hockey players of Italy
Ice hockey players at the 1984 Winter Olympics
Ice hockey players at the 1994 Winter Olympics
Ice hockey players at the 1998 Winter Olympics
Italian television personalities
Sportspeople from Plzeň
Czechoslovak emigrants to Italy
HC Merano players
Bolzano HC players
Italian ice hockey coaches